Pottsville Schools (or Pottsville School District No. 61) is a public school district in Pottsville, Arkansas. The Board of Education, a five (5) member group, is the level of government which has responsibilities over all activities related to public elementary and secondary school education within the jurisdiction of the Pottsville School District.

Schools
 Pottsville High School
 Pottsville Junior High School
 Pottsville Middle Grades
 Pottsville Elementary School

See also
 List of school districts in Arkansas

External links
 Pottsville Schools

Education in Pope County, Arkansas
School districts in Arkansas